Pinus × rhaetica, commonly known as Rhætic pine, the species name refers to the Rhætica alps, located in eastern Switzerland and western Austria. Rhaetic pine is described as a natural hybrid of Mountain pine (Pinus mugo) and Scots pine (Pinus sylvestris). It is a coniferous tree nothospecies located in the subsection Pinus.

Description 
Pinus × rhaetica has variable morphology. Commonly Rhætic pines grow as trees, although some are shrubby in form. The trees are 4.5–8 m tall, 3 m broad.

The trunk is gray-brown, grayer and more frequently divided into irregular plates than in Pinus mugo. The bark on major branches resembles that of P. sylvestris in being reddish brown with papery flakes, but it can also be more like P. mugo and greyish and persistent.

The leaves (needles) are 4 cm long, usually fresh or dark green like those of P. mugo, although they can be bluish green like those of P. sylvestris, depending on where along the intergrade zone the trees exist. (The images on the left perfectly demonstrate these traits)

Seed cones resemble those of P. mugo, with strongly developed apophyses on one side, and are often more robust than those of P. sylvestris. Young cones purple-brown, matt, with 3 mm long stalk. Mature cones are oval, cuspidate, 3–3.5 cm long.

Distribution and habitat 
The Rhætic pine (Pinus × rhaetica) occurs occasionally throughout the regions where the two species overlap, from the northern side of the French Pyrenees through the Alps to the Carpathians in Slovakia, usually at the junction of the sub-alpine habitat of P. mugo and the montane forests of P. sylvestris.

The Rhætic pine has been introduced into some Baltic states, with very sparse populations present in western Lithuania.

In Poland, the Rhætic pine is considered an endangered species with a high risk of extinction in nature in the near future.

See also 
 Hybridization in pines

References

External links 
 Pinus × rhaetica stands in the Węgliniec forest district (photos)

rhaetica
Interspecific plant hybrids
Rhaetian Alps
Alpine flora